Marani is a village in Abasha Municipality of Georgia. It is situated on the right bank of Tskhenis-Tsqali river, which serves as a border between Abasha and Samtredia Municipalities. Population: 1153 (2014 census)

See also
 Samegrelo-Zemo Svaneti

References

Populated places in Samegrelo-Zemo Svaneti